Jaiden Kaine  is an American actor. He is known for his roles in Killing Lincoln and The Vampire Diaries. He has Cuban, Irish, and Antiguan ancestry. He was a member of the military outfit Blackwater.

Filmography

References

External links 
 

Living people
Male actors from New York City
American male film actors
American male television actors
21st-century American male actors
Date of birth missing (living people)
Year of birth missing (living people)